Brévillers may refer to:
 Brévillers, Pas-de-Calais, a commune in France
 Brévillers, Somme, a commune in France

See also
 Bréville (disambiguation)